R. J. Kors (born June 27, 1966) is a former American football defensive back. He played for the New York Jets from 1991 to 1992 and for the Cincinnati Bengals in 1993.

References

1966 births
Living people
American football defensive backs
USC Trojans football players
Long Beach State 49ers football players
New York Jets players
Cincinnati Bengals players